"The Choice Is Yours (Revisited)" is a song by the Native Tongues affiliate Black Sheep, from their debut album A Wolf in Sheep's Clothing. It was released in October 1991 as the second single from the album. The song quotes the Roger Miller song, "Engine Engine Number 9".

Samples
The song samples drums from "Keep On Doin' It" by New Birth, a riff from "Impressions" by McCoy Tyner, and vocals from "I'd Say It Again" by Sweet Linda Divine. It also includes an interpolation of Roger Miller's Engine Engine Number 9.

Music video

The music video, which was released in November 1991, features Dres rapping in front of a crowd at a rooftop nightclub.

Track listing
A-side
"The Choice Is Yours (Revisited)" - 4:03 [not available on vinyl LP release]  
"The Choice Is Yours" (Radio Mix) - 3:23

B-side
"Have U.N.E. Pull" (Remix) - 3:38  
"Yes (Everything's OK)" - 3:20 [not available on vinyl LP release]

Charts

In popular culture

The song was also featured in the 2018 film Spider-Man: Into the Spider-Verse as part of a mash-up with "Apache" by the Incredible Bongo Band and "Mary, Mary" by Run–D.M.C. This version of the song was not included on the film soundtrack.
The song was also featured in the films Step Up, You Got Served and Lakeview Terrace.
In 2008, "The Choice Is Yours" was ranked number #73 on VH1's 100 Greatest Hip Hop Songs. 
The song was used in the video games  True Crime: New York City, NBA Street Vol. 2 and Aggressive Inline.
The song also gained a new popularity after it was featured in a commercial for the 2010 Kia Soul.
In 2016, the song was covered in Airheads commercials.

Covers and sampling

"The Choice Is Yours (Revisited)" was sampled by N.O.R.E. on his eponymous debut album, on the track titled "Mathematics (Esta Loca)". It is also sampled in KRS-One's "Hip Hop vs. Rap", Home Team's "Pick It Up", and "Be Faithful" by Fatman Scoop. Karmin sampled the beat in their song "Crash Your Party".
A reworked version of the song's chorus is featured in "Weapon of Choice" by Fatboy Slim. Nas also sampled the song in '90s remix to "Where Are They Now", a track where Nas laments the absence of the skilled rappers he had enjoyed in the early days of hip-hop. The Bloodhound Gang have also covered the song.
The first line of the chorus is sampled in the E3 presentation for Skylanders: Swap Force.
The song is sampled in Tech N9ne's Hood Go Crazy.
Dres cameos in the music video for Gang Starr's 2019 single "Family and Loyalty", when the sample "And you can't beat that with a bat" is lip synced.

References

1991 singles
1991 songs
Black Sheep (group) songs
Mercury Records singles
PolyGram singles
Jazz rap songs